Adwa - An African Victory is a 1999 Ethiopian documentary film directed by Haile Gerima.  It concerns the Battle of Adowa (Adwa) (1896).

Plot summary 
In 1896, Ethiopia defeats an Italian military bent on conquest and colonization.

The Ethiopian people rise to triumph over the Italians at the Battle of Adwa. The event ignited a lasting flame of hope, of freedom and independence in the hearts of African people.

The film illustrates an inspirational source of African empowerment.

External links 

1999 films
Ethiopian documentary films
Amharic-language films
1990s English-language films
English-language Ethiopian films
Films set in Ethiopia
Documentary films about war
Films directed by Haile Gerima
Documentary films about African resistance to colonialism
1999 documentary films
1999 multilingual films